The 2018–19 Morgan State Bears men's basketball team represented Morgan State University in the 2018–19 NCAA Division I men's basketball season. They played their home games at Talmadge L. Hill Field House in Baltimore, Maryland, and were led by 13th-year head coach Todd Bozeman. The Bears finished the season 9–21, 4–12 in MEAC play to finish in tenth place. As the No. 10 seed in the MEAC tournament, they lost in the first round to Coppin State.

Previous season
The Bears finished the 2017–18 season 13–19, 7–9 in MEAC play to finish in a three-way tie for seventh place. As the No. 7 seed in the MEAC tournament, they defeated South Carolina State and Bethune–Cookman, before losing to North Carolina Central in the semifinals.

Roster

Schedule and results

|-
!colspan=12 style=| Non-Conference Regular season

|-
!colspan=12 style=| MEAC regular season

|-
!colspan=12 style=| MEAC tournament
|-

|-

Source

References

Morgan State Bears men's basketball seasons
Morgan State Bears
Morgan State Bears men's basketball team
Morgan State Bears men's basketball team